Phalaris caroliniana is a species of grass known as Carolina canarygrass and maygrass.

Background 
It is native to the southern United States, and it can be found as a naturalized species along the west coast of the United States, as well as northern Mexico and parts of Europe and Australia. It is most often found in moist to wet habitats, such as marshy meadows, and it can thrive in disturbed areas.

This grass probably made up part of the Eastern Agricultural Complex of plants cultivated by prehistoric Native Americans in the United States. Its grains have been identified in archaeological sites from Texas to Indiana to Alabama which may be four millennia old. Laboratory analysis of the grass seed indicates that it is quite nutritious, with a good amount of vitamins and minerals.

References

External links
Jepson Manual Treatment - Phalaris caroliniana
Grass Manual Treatment - Phalaris caroliniana

caroliniana
Grasses of the United States
Grasses of Alabama
Native grasses of Texas
Flora of the Southeastern United States
Crops originating from Pre-Columbian North America
Plants described in 1788
Cereals
Flora without expected TNC conservation status